= Yoshishigea =

Scientific classification
- Kingdom: Animalia
- Phylum: Mollusca
- Class: Gastropoda
- Family: Pyramidellidae
- Genus: Yoshishigea; Hori & Fukuda, 1999

Type species
- Yoshishigea choshuana Hori, S. & H. Fukuda, 1999

Genus of gastropods

Yoshishigea is a genus of sea snails, marine gastropod mollusks in the family Pyramidellidae, the pyrams and their allies.

== Species ==
Species within the genus Yoshishigea include:

- Yoshishigea choshuana Hori & Fukuda, 1999
