= Yoshishigea choshuana =

Scientific classification
- Kingdom: Animalia
- Phylum: Mollusca
- Class: Gastropoda
- Family: Pyramidellidae
- Genus: Yoshishigea
- Species: Y. choshuana

Binomial name
- Yoshishigea choshuana Hori & Fukuda, 1999

Species of gastropod

Yoshishigea choshuana is a species of sea snail, a marine gastropod mollusk in the family Pyramidellidae, the pyrams and their allies.
